A debate is a contention in argument; strife, dissension, quarrelling, controversy; especially a formal discussion of subjects before a public assembly or legislature.

Debate may also refer to:
 Debate (parliamentary procedure)
 Competitive debate, a form of debate between two assigned school teams:
 Lincoln–Douglas debate format
 Parliamentary debate
 Policy debate
 Public forum debate
 "The Debate" (The West Wing), the seventh episode of the seventh season of the serial political drama
 "The Debate" (Parks and Recreation), the twentieth episode of the fourth season of the comedy television series
 Debate Team (band), an American indie power-pop band and supergroup
 United States presidential election debates

See also
Conversation (disambiguation)
Discussion page (disambiguation)